Agrarian National Party (in Spanish: Partido Nacional Agrario) was a political party in Peru. It was founded in 1930 by Pedro Beltrán Espantoso, Gerardo Klinge and Manuel González Olaechea.
1930 establishments in Peru
Defunct agrarian political parties
Defunct political parties in Peru
Political parties established in 1930
Political parties with year of disestablishment missing